"Saint Patrick's Breastplate" is an Old Irish prayer of protection of the "lorica" type (hence "Lorica Sancti Patricii", or "The Lorica of Saint Patrick") attributed to Saint Patrick.

Its title is given as Faeth Fiada in the 11th-century Liber Hymnorum that records the text. This has been interpreted as the "Deer's Cry" by Middle Irish popular etymology, but it is more likely a term for a "spell of concealment". It is also known by its incipit (repeated at the beginning of the first five sections) atomruig indiu, or "I bind unto myself today".

The prayer
The prayer is part of the Liber Hymnorum, an 11th-century collection of hymns found in two manuscripts kept in Dublin. It is also present, in a more fragmentary state, in the 9th-century Vita tripartita Sancti Patricii.
It was  edited in 1888 (Vita Tripartita), in 1898 (Liber Hymnorum), and  again published in 1903 in the Thesaurus Paleohibernicus.

The Liber Hymnorum  gives this account of how Saint Patrick used this prayer:
Saint Patrick sang this when an ambush was laid against his coming by Loegaire, that he might not go to Tara to sow the faith. And then it appeared before those lying in ambush that they (Saint Patrick and his monks) were wild deer with a fawn following them.

The description concludes "fáeth fiada a hainm", which was interpreted as  "Deer's Cry" by the medieval editor of the Liber Hymnorum (hence the connection to the deer metamorphosis), but the Old Irish fáeth fiada properly refers to a "mist of concealment".

The prayer as recorded is dated on linguistic grounds to the early 8th century.
John Colgan (1647) attributed the prayer to Saint Evin, the author of the 9th-century Vita Tripartita.
It was also Colgan who reported the title of Lorica Patricii.

Christian in content, it shows pre-Christian influence. Because of this it is also known as the "Lorica of St. Patrick" or as "St. Patrick's Breastplate".

The term Lorica is used of a number of Old Irish prayers, 
including one attributed to Dallán Forgaill and another to Saint Fursey. 
They all arose in the context of early Irish monasticism, in the 6th to 8th centuries.
It isn't clear when the Latin title of Lorica was first applied to them, but the term is used in the 17th century by John Colgan.
The allusion is probably to Ephesians 6:14, where the Apostle bids his readers stand, "having put on the breast-plate of righteousness".

Summary 
The first five sections of the prayer or hymn begin atomruig indiu "I bind unto myself today", followed by a list of sources of strength that the prayer calls on for support.

The text is conventionally divided into eleven sections:
invocation of the  Trinity.
invocation of Christ's baptism, death, resurrection, ascension and future return on the last day.
invocation of the virtues of angels, patriarchs, saints and martyrs.
invocation of the virtues of the natural world: the sun, fire, lightning, wind, etc.
invocation of various aspects of God – his wisdom, his eye, his ear, his hand, etc.
lists of the things against which protection is required, including false prophets, heathens, heretics, witches and wizards (druids)
brief invocation of Christ for protection
repeated invocation of Christ to be ever present (Christ with me, Christ before me, Christ behind me, etc.)
continuation of the theme of Christ within every man
repetition of the first verse
short stanza in Latin (invoking Psalm 3:8, "Salvation is the Lord's")

Text

Translations and adaptations
John Colgan published a Latin translation in his Acta Triadis Thaumaturgae (1647).

In the early 19th century, Irish scholars George Petrie and John O'Donovan misanalyzed the first word atomruig as containing Temur, for Temoria or Tara. This is followed by James Clarence Mangan (1803–1849), whose translation begins "At Tarah to-day, in this awful hour, I call on the Holy Trinity!". The literal translation by  recognized this error and gives the translation "I bind to myself to-day".

In 1889, the prayer was adapted into the hymn I Bind Unto Myself Today by C. F. Alexander. A number of other adaptations have been made.

Several different modern English versions of the prayer can be found. For example, some render the beginning atomruig indiu of each major section more freely as  "I clasp unto my heart today"  rather than the literal "I bind/join to myself today." 
Various other trivial variants are found, such as the verse "Against spells of women, and smiths, and druids" as "Against spells of witches and smiths and wizards".

There is another class of free or poetic translations which deviate from the original meaning, e.g. replacing the verse "Christ in the fort, Christ in the chariot seat, and Christ in the poop [deck]" with "Christ when I lie down, Christ when I sit down, Christ when I arise."

Catholic prayer cards which have popularized this prayer feature a truncated version in the interest of space.

Victorian hymn
C. F. Alexander (1818–1895) wrote a hymn based on St. Patrick's Breastplate in 1889 at the request of H. H. Dickinson, Dean of the Chapel Royal at Dublin Castle. Dean Dickinson wrote about this:
I wrote to her suggesting that she should fill a gap in our Irish Church Hymnal by giving us a metrical version of St. Patrick's 'Lorica' and I sent her a carefully collated copy of the best prose translations of it. Within a week she sent me that version which appears in the appendix to our Church Hymnal."

As usual, Alexander wrote the poems only. The music to the hymn was originally set in 1902 by Charles Villiers Stanford for chorus and organ, using two traditional Irish tunes, St. Patrick and Gartan, which Stanford took from his own edition (1895) of George Petrie's Collection of the Ancient Music of Ireland (originally 1855). This is known by its opening line "I bind unto myself today". It is currently included in the Lutheran Service Book (Lutheran Church – Missouri Synod), the English Hymnal, the Irish Church Hymnal and The Hymnal (1982) of the US Episcopal Church. It is often sung during the celebration of the Feast of Saint Patrick on or near 17 March as well as on Trinity Sunday. In many churches it is unique among standard hymns because the variations in length and metre of verses mean that at least three melodic forms are required (one tune which is sung at half-length and in full for depending on the verse length, and one entirely different tune).

Musical adaptations
St. Patrick's Breastplate (tune - Tara) in the Irish Church Hymnal (1890) by Irish composer Thomas Richard Gonsalvez Jozé (1853–1924).
St. Patrick's Breastplate (tune - St. Patrick, and for verse eight - Gartan) (1902), by Irish composer Charles Villiers Stanford (1852–1924) – see above. This is the best known arrangement of this hymn.
St. Patrick's Breastplate (1912), an arrangement by Charles Villiers Stanford (1852–1924) of his own music to C.F. Alexander's hymn, here for mixed choir, organ, brass, side drum and cymbals.
St. Patrick's Breastplate (1924), a work for mixed choir and piano by the English composer Arnold Bax (1883–1953).
Hymn of St. Patrick at Tara (1930), a work for bass soloist, mixed choir and organ by Irish composer Dermot Macmurrough (a.k.a. Harold R. White, 1872–1943) to a poetic interpretation by Olive Meyler.
St. Patrick's Hymn (1965) by US folk-guitarist John Fahey (1939–2001) on the album "The Transfiguration of Blind Joe Death".
St. Patrick's Breastplate for SSA voices by English composer Mary Chater (1896-1990).
Christ Be Beside Me (also Christ Beside Me) and This Day God Gives Me, adaptations by James J. Quinn to the tune of Bunessan, published in his 1969 book New Hymns for All Seasons
The Deer's Cry (1983) by Irish composer Shaun Davey (born 1948) is based on a translation by Kuno Meyer.
Arise Today (1995) for choir and organ by US composer Libby Larsen (born 1950).
The Deer's Cry (2008), a choral work by Estonian composer Arvo Pärt (born 1935).
In his 2016 album, "Hymns, Prayers, and Invitations", Rick Lee James opens the album with a modern setting of St. Patrick's Breastplate titled Christ Is Lord (Christ Before Me).
"The Lorica" is an adaptation of St. Patrick's Breastplate on Canadian singer-songwriter Steve Bell's 2008 Album, Devotion.

Modern interpretations
In his seminal study 'The Primal Vision: Christian presence Amid African Religion', (SCM Press,  London  1963) John Vernon Taylor,  later Bishop of Winchester, claimed that St Patrick's Breastplate 'contains all the spiritual awareness of the primal vision and lifts it into the fullness of Christ.' He concludes by quoting the whole prayer in Kuno Meyer's version, exclaiming 'Would that it were translated and sung in every tongue in Africa!' 

Since the 1980s, a resurgent interest in "Celtic spirituality" among some Christian authors led to the popularisation of the Lorica as an example of specifically "Celtic".
For example,  David Adam has written some books about Celtic prayers and spiritual exercises for modern Christians. In one of his books, The Cry Of The Deer, he used the Lorica of St Patrick as a way to Celtic spirituality.  

John Davies,  Bishop of Shrewsbury, provides a verse-by-verse commentary on the Breastplate in 'A Song for Every Morning: Dedication and Defiance with St Patrick's Breastplate'  (Norwich,  Canterbury Press 2008),  based largely on experience of the struggle against apartheid in South Africa. A foreword by Kathy Galloway, Leader of the Iona Community, notes how the Breastplate brings together the personal and the political in Christian discipleship.

References

Notes

Citations

Sources

 

Dibble, Jeremy; Stanford Sacred Choral Music, Vol. 3 Notes. London, 1998.

External links

Irish Christian hymns
Irish poetry
Spiritual warfare
Saint Patrick